Yaser Al-Gabr (born 1 January 1993) is a Yemeni footballer who plays for Al-Oruba.

Honours 
Al-Oruba
Winner
 Yemeni Super Cup: 2011

External links 
 

1993 births
Living people
Yemeni footballers
Yemen international footballers
Association football forwards
Al-Oruba (Yemeni) players
Yemeni League players